Émile Jean Armel-Beaufils was a French sculptor born in Rennes in 1882 and who died in Saint-Briac in 1952.

Biography

Émile Jean Armel-Beaufils started his schooling in Fougères then at a lycée in Rennes. He studied law and then literature but attended evening classes at the Rennes Ếcole des Beaux-Arts. He then attended the Rennes Ếcole des Beaux-Arts on a full-time basis from 1902 to 1905 moving then to the Ếcole nationale supérieure des Beaux-Arts in Paris where he studied under Luc-Olivier Merson, Antonin Mercié and Jules Jacques Labatut. On leaving art school he began to exhibit his work at the Salon des artistes français and in 1914 won their bronze medal. He was to be awarded a silver medal in 1921 and continued to exhibit every year until 1951. He was served with mobilization papers when war broke out in 1914, but then released on health grounds.  Between 1917 and 1920 he worked on several war memorials in the Brittany region and also worked on several commemorative memorials such as that to Anatole Le Braz in Perros-Guirec and to Aristide Briand in Saint-Briac.  He also worked with the Henriot factory from 1929 onwards producing porcelain figures. With his wife and fellow sculptor Zannic Beaufils he spent much of his time in Saint-Briac-sur-Mer

Her best known solo work is the granite monument in Saint-Brieuc entitled "Anatole Le Braz écoutant Marc'harit Fulup". Marc'harit Fulup was a Breton story teller.

Main works

Émile Jean Armel-Beaufils' main works are listed below.

Works in the Musée des beaux-arts de Rennes
This art gallery holds the following Armel-Beaufils works:-

"La Fée des grèves". This bronze dates to around 1942.

"Buste de jeune fille-Mademoiselle Lecourbe". A marble bust dating to 1932. 

"Après le pardon". This statuette in wood dates to around 1942 and was purchased by the French State from the "" held in Rennes from 17 October 15 November 1942

"Le Procès de Jeanne d’Arc". This bronze statuette dates to 1942.

"Les rameaux"
This Armel-Beaufils marble work is held by the Rennes' Hôtel de la préfecture d'Ille-et-Vilaine

Works in the Saint-Briac-sur-Mer mairie
There are many Armel Beaufils works in the town hall at 18 rue de la Mairie in
Saint-Briac-sur-Mer.  These include:-

Other works

"La conquête des connaissances universelles, ou Science et navigation"
This 1931 plaster relief was purchased by the French government for the main entrance to the then Merchant Navy (La Marine marchande) Ministry building at 3 place Fontenay in Paris and in 1933 another version was purchased for the new Hôtel de ville in Perros-Guirec where it can be seen in the "salle des conseils".

"Monument Victoria"
Located in Saint-Briac-sur-Mer's boulevard de la Mer, this 1937 bronze plaque by Armel Beaufils depicts the Russian aristocrat Victoria Melita (Princess Victoria Melita of Saxe-Coburg and Gotha), a friend of Jacques Nozal who lived in Saint-Briac-sur-Mer's villa des Emaux.

"Quimper ou Les Trois Bretonnes"
This plaster model dating to 1930 is held in Quimper's Musée des beaux-arts.  In his composition Armel-Beaufils presents us with three faces of the region of Finistère showing the different types of cap worn by the women of the region. The woman to the left wears the cap worn in Plougastel-Daoulas, the woman to the right the cap worn in Rosporden and the woman in the centre the cap and neckwear of a woman in Bigouden. The work was for a proposed monument for Quimper railway station.

"Jeune Trégorroise en costume"
This statuette is held in the Perros-Guirec hôtel de ville. A woman in Breton costume carries a book in her left hand and a bunch of flowers. The work had been presented to the Perros-Guirec museum in 1936.

Monument to François-René de Chateaubriand
This 1948 monument with sculpture by Armel Beaufils stands on the old ramparts of Saint Malo, Chateaubriand's birthplace. It was erected to celebrate the centenary of Chateaubriand's death. Saint Malo is rich in sculpture and has works on public display by Francis Pellerin, André Bizette-Lindet, Eugène Dodeigne, Henri Chaumont,  René Quillivic and many others.
Armel-Beaufils had already of course worked on the Saint-Malo and Saint-Servan war memorials. The municipal library of Fougères hold the 1948 plaster maquettes of the statues of Velleda and Cymodocée which were intended to decorate the Chateaubriand monument but never used. There had been a bronze statue of Chateaubriand in Saint Malo by Aimé Millet dating back to 1875 but this had been dismantled by the occupying Germans in 1942 to satisfy their thirst for bronze to manufacture weaponry.

Saint-Briac-sur-Mer Post Office
The front of the post office has a relief by Armel Beaufils.

"Le Pardon"
This 1949 Armel Beaufils work in granite is located in Saint-Cast-le-Guildo at the Pointe du Loup and what is known as the "Oratoire Notre-Dame de la Garde". The oratory of Notre-Dame-de-la-Garde is dedicated to the people of Saint-Cast-le-Guildo who survived the bombings of August 1944 and the subsequent liberation. The statue of the Virgin Mary "Notre-Dame-de-la-Garde" on the top of the oratory is the work of Armel Beaufils and his wife Zannic.

"Promenade au Clair de Lune" Dinard
This public walkway in Dinard is decorated with various sculptures including busts of Paul Crolard and Jules Boutin and a 1937 bas-relief by Armel Beaufils entitled "Le débarquement de jean iv de bretagne en 1379".

Monument to Aristide Briand
The monument to Aristide Briand, originally known as the "Pierre du Souvenir", is located in Trébeurden. At the top of the monument there is an Armel-Beaufils medallion containing a bas-relief profile portrait of this French politician and below this a bronze sculpture of a young boy. The front of the monument carries the inscription  continued on the back  It was the left-liberal Breton faction "Les Bleus de Bretagne" who were behind the idea of setting up the monument and Trébeurden was chosen as Briand was a regular visitor to the resort from 1919 to 1928 and had a house there. The sculpture of the young man, entitled the "Gamin de Trébeurden" had been cast in bronze by the Paris founder H. Rouard and shown at the 1933 Paris salon before being used at Trébeurden.

"La dernière épingle"
This sculpture can be seen in the mairie of Tréguier.

"Torse de femme"
This 1922 Armel Beaufils marble sculpture is held in the Paris Sénat.

"Jeune femme"
A work in marble dating to 1912 and held in the Ministère de l'éducation nationale, de la recherche et de la technologie
in Paris.

"paysanne du Trégor"
This 1932 sculpture can be seen in the Perros-Guirec mairie.

"La paysanne et le paysan de Pontivy"
Two sculptures can be seen in Pontivy at the junction of the Avenue Napoléon I  and the Boulevard Alsace-Lorraine. One is by Émile Armel-Beaufils and depicts a Pontivy woman whilst René Quillivic has sculpted a Pontivy man. Both wear regional dress and Quillivic's work is called "Le Mouton Blanc".

Monument to Anatole Le Braz
This monument stands in Perros-Guirec's rue Gabriel-Vicaire and is what is known as "La Roche des Poètes" and there is a bronze plaque depicting Anatole Le Braz attached to a huge rock. The idea was born in 1910 and the Perros-Guirec tourist office had the idea of devoting an area between La Clarté and Ploumanac'h to contain a tribute to "men of letters" who came from this part of Brittany and the tribute to the writer Anatole Le Braz was Émile Jean Armel-Beaufils's contribution. There are three medallions attached to the rock, that depicting Anatole Le Braz and two others, a portrait of the poet Gabriel Vicaire by Pierre Charles Lenoir and of Charles Le Goffic by Louis Henri Nicot

War memorials
Brittany lost some 240,000 men killed in the 1914-1918 war and every family and every commune was touched by that war and as was the case throughout France there was a hunger to mark these losses with some form of memorial. Those left behind felt it a duty to honour those lost in some tangible form and in November 1919 the association "La Bretagne artistique" sent a circular to all Breton Hotel de ville promising their cooperation in creating sculptural decoration for the memorials erected.

Monument celebrating the liberation of Saint-Briac-sur-Mer in 1944
Armel-Beaufils decorates the memorial with a bronze medallion of a helmeted "GI" in profile. The liberation of Saint-Briac-sur-Mer by the Americans in August 1944 is celebrated.

Funerary sculpture
Armel-Beaufils' work included the following works of a funerary nature:-

Note

References

Literature
 Prevel, Corinne, La démarche régionaliste d'Armel Beaufils, in: Delouche Denise. La création bretonne 1900-1940. Arts de l'Ouest. Rennes : P.U.R., 1995, p. 81-92.
 Dressaye, Catherine, Devaux, Anne-Louise and Yves (dir.). Armel et Zannic Beaufils. Saint-Briac-sur-Mer : Association Namasté, 1996.

1882 births
1952 deaths
Artists from Rennes
Sculptors from Brittany
Bleus de Bretagne members
Breton artists
20th-century French sculptors
French male sculptors